Noah Schmitt (born 20 September 1999) is a German footballer who plays as a defender for FC Eddersheim.

References

1999 births
Footballers from Frankfurt
Living people
German footballers
Association football defenders
FSV Frankfurt players
3. Liga players
Oberliga (football) players